Yahya of Antioch, full name Yaḥya ibn Saʿīd al-Anṭākī, was a Melkite Christian physician and historian of the 11th century.

He was most likely born in Fatimid Egypt. He became a physician, but the anti-Christian policies of Caliph Al-Hakim bi-Amr Allah (r. 996–1021) forced him to flee to Byzantine-held Antioch.

His chief work is a continuation of Eutychius' Annals, stretching from 938 to 1034. Drawing on a variety of sources, his history deals with events in the Byzantine Empire, Egypt, as well as Bulgaria and the Kievan Rus'. Whilst in Antioch, he also wrote theological works in defence of Christianity and refutations of Islam and Judaism. He died ca. 1066. 

His history was published, edited and translated by I. Kratchkovsky and A. Vasiliev into French in Volumes 18, 23, and 47 of the Patrologia Orientalis, and into Italian.
 Volume 18 of the Patrologia Orientalis, including the first part (sections 1-135) of Yahya's history, at the Internet Archive (pp. 698–833)
 Volume 23 of the Patrologia Orientalis, including the second part (sections 136-312) of Yahya's history, at the Internet Archive (pp. 346–520)

References

Sources
 

1066 deaths
11th-century Byzantine physicians
11th-century Byzantine historians
Arab Christians
Byzantine theologians
11th-century Egyptian people
Year of birth unknown
Byzantine people of Arab descent
11th-century Christian theologians
11th-century Byzantine writers